Khaled Hroub (Arabic: خالد الحروب) is a Palestinian academic, a senior research fellow at the Centre of Islamic Studies and the co-ordinator of the Cambridge Arab Media Project (CAMP) at the University of Cambridge. He is also professor of Middle Eastern studies at Northwestern University in Qatar.
 
A Muslim, he is a voice for the moderate form of Islam.

Hroub is the author of Hamas: Political Thought and Practice (Institute for Palestine Studies, 2000), and Hamas: a Beginner's Guide (Pluto Press, 2006), and editor of Political Islam: Context versus Ideology (Saqi Books, 2010) and Religious Broadcasting in the Middle East (2012). His publications in Arabic include Fragility of Ideology and Might of Politics (2010), In Praise of Revolution (2012), the literary collection Tattoo of Cities (2008), and the poetry collection Enchantress of Poetry (2008).

References 

Academics of the University of Cambridge
Living people
Year of birth missing (living people)
Northwestern University faculty
Palestinian academics